Taromeo is a rural locality in the South Burnett Region, Queensland, Australia. In the  Taromeo had a population of 335 people.

History
The locality presumably takes its name from the surrounding parish of Tarameo, which in turn takes its name from the Taromeo pastoral station which was named in 1842 by Simon Scott. It is probably a corruption of the Waka language word tarum meaning wild lime tree.

Taromeo was opened for selection on 17 April 1877;  were available.

Taromeo State School opened on 18 October 1909 and closed on 1 February 1942.

Taromeo Soldiers' Settlement State School opened on 5 November 1934 and closed on 19 March 1944.

In the  Taromeo had a population of 335 people.

On 1 February 2018, Taromeo's postcode changed from 4306 to 4314.

References 

South Burnett Region
Localities in Queensland